Khindakh is a rural locality (a selo) in Gunibsky District, Republic of Dagestan, Russia. The population was 1,170 as of 2010.

Geography 
Khindakh is located 5 km north of Gunib (the district's administrative centre) by road. Khotoch and Gunib are the nearest rural localities.

Nationalities 
Avars live there.

References 

Rural localities in Gunibsky District